Manuela Darling-Gansser (29 December 1950) is a writer of food and travel cookbooks, a contributor to lifestyle magazines and has appeared as a repeat guest on Australian television shows. She has written four books: Under The Olive Tree (2003), Autumn in Piemonte (2005), Winter in the Alps (2007) and TOP 10 Surviving in Style: Recipes and Instruction for the Beginner Home Chef (2008)

Biography

Manuela Darling-Gansser was born in the Italian speaking city of Lugano, Switzerland. She spent her early childhood living in Iran before returning
to school in Zurich. Darling-Gansser has lived in Italy, the United States, Japan and currently lives with husband Michael Darling and three children Miranda, Jason and Daniel in Sydney, Australia. She is fluent in English, Italian, French, German and Swiss German, as well as being able to converse in Spanish and Persian.

Family history

Darling-Gansser is part of a long line of cooks beginning with her great grandfather who in 1882 opened Ristorante Biaggi in Lugano. Her grandfather Ettore Biaggi trained in hotels in London, Paris, and St Petersberg and had a weekly radio cooking show before taking over the family restaurant. Ristorante Biaggi's guests included the Aga Khan, Sir Austen Chamberlain, Benito Mussolini, General Guisan, Dolfuss, Mannerheim and King Farouk of Egypt. Professor Augusto Gansser-Biaggi, her father, is a geologist whose book Geology of the Himalaya earned him the award of the Patron's Medal of the Royal Geographical Society London.

Published works

Manuela Darling-Gansser along with Australian photographer Simon Griffiths has produced three food and travel books published by Hardie Grant Books:
Under The Olive Tree: Family and food in Lugano and the Costa Smeralda, Italy (2003)*^
 Autumn in Piemonte: Food and travels in Italy's northwest (2005)^
 Winter in the Alps: Food by the fireside (2007)

 *Winner of "The Ligare Book Printers Best Designed Cookbook" prize at the Australian Publishers Association 52nd Annual Book Design Awards, 2003.
 ^Has been translated into Dutch and published by Tirion

References

External links
www.manuelafoodandtravel.com

Italian food writers
1950 births
Living people
Women cookbook writers
People from Lugano
Swiss expatriates in Australia
Swiss people of Italian descent